The 1986 Philadelphia Phillies season was the 104th season for the Phillies. Under second-year manager John Felske, the Phillies stayed just below the .500 mark for roughly two-thirds of the season, until a charge after the All-Star break pushed the club past the St. Louis Cardinals and Montreal Expos into second place in the NL East. The eventual World Series champions rival New York Mets finished with a Major League best 108–54 record, and finished 21 games ahead of the Phillies. The Mets and the Phillies were the only teams in the National League East to post winning records. Mike Schmidt became the first third baseman in the history of the National League to win the MVP Award three times.

Offseason
 December 6, 1985: Jerry Koosman was released by the Phillies.
 December 22, 1985: Tim Corcoran was released by the Phillies.
 January 16, 1986: Ronn Reynolds was traded by the New York Mets with Jeff Bittiger to the Philadelphia Phillies for Rodger Cole and Ronnie Gideon.
 March 17, 1986: Alan Knicely was released by the Phillies.

Regular season

On August 20, 1986, pitcher Don Carman took a perfect game into the ninth inning against the San Francisco Giants at Candlestick Park. Giants catcher Bob Brenly hit a long drive into the gap in left-center field. Phillies center fielder Milt Thompson was positioned to make a running catch but the ball hit the base of his glove and was ruled a hit. Carman pitched nine innings, gave up one hit, and was the winner when the Phillies scored in the top of the tenth on a Juan Samuel solo homer to win the game 1 to 0.

The Phillies were the only team in the National League to post a winning record against the World Series champs, going 10–8 with a 7–2 mark at Veterans Stadium. The high point of the season for the Phillies was the three-game sweep of the Mets in mid-September. On September 12, up by 22 games, the Mets needed to win one game to clinch the division and came to Philadelphia for a weekend series. The Phillies won all three games, finishing the weekend by beating the Mets 6–0 behind a six-hit shutout by Kevin Gross, who also tripled home two runs. The sweep still left the Phillies down 19 games but was both especially satisfying given the significant number of Mets fans who had traveled to Veterans Stadium for the weekend hoping to see the Mets clinch, and necessary because they were swept in a three-game series in Chicago preceding this series and did not want to see a visiting team's division-title celebration at Veterans Stadium. Had the Mets won one of the three games, it would have been the first time that a division title was won at Veterans Stadium. During the series, Mets fans at Veterans Stadium became unruly and damaged seats in the upper deck. One Mets fan was arrested after striking at two Philadelphia police officers.

The club scored a season-high 19 runs in a 19–1 throttling of the Chicago Cubs at the Vet on June 23.

Hall-of-Fame third baseman Mike Schmidt won the NL MVP for the third and final time in his career with a league-high 37 home runs with 119 RBI and a .290 average. The Phillies distant second-place finish made Schmidt the first major-league MVP to have played on a team that finished at least 20 games out of first place.

Season standings

Record vs. opponents

Notable transactions
 April 19, 1986: Tom Gorman was signed as a free agent by the Phillies.
 May 9, 1986: Dave Stewart was released by the Phillies.
 June 2, 1986: Chuck Knoblauch was drafted by the Phillies in the 18th round of the 1986 Major League Baseball draft, but did not sign.
 June 24, 1986: Steve Carlton was released by the Phillies.
 July 24, 1986: Tom Foley and Lary Sorensen were traded by the Phillies to the Montreal Expos for Dan Schatzeder and Skeeter Barnes.

1986 Game Log

|- style="background:#fbb"
| 1 || April 7 || @ Reds || 4–7 || Mario Soto (1–0) || Steve Carlton (0–1) || Ron Robinson (1) || 54,960 || 0–1
|- style="background:#bfb"
| 2 || April 9 || @ Reds || 5–3 (11) || Steve Bedrosian (1–0) || Ted Power (0–1) || None || 11,411 || 1–1
|- style="background:#fbb"
| 3 || April 11 || Mets || 7–9 || Bob Ojeda (1–0) || Kevin Gross (0–1) || Jesse Orosco (1) || 36,190 || 1–2
|- style="background:#bfb"
| 4 || April 12 || Mets || 9–8 (14) || Charles Hudson (1–0) || Randy Niemann (0–1) || None || 22,737 || 2–2
|- style="background:#bfb"
| 5 || April 13 || Mets || 4–2 || Shane Rawley (1–0) || Rick Aguilera (0–1) || None || 27,691 || 3–2
|- style="background:#fbb"
| 6 || April 14 || Pirates || 1–3 (10) || Cecilio Guante (1–0) || Steve Bedrosian (1–1) || Jim Winn (1) || 16,200 || 3–3
|- style="background:#bbb"
| – || April 15 || Pirates || colspan=6 | Postponed (rain); Makeup: August 15 as a traditional double-header
|- style="background:#bbb"
| – || April 16 || Pirates || colspan=6 | Postponed (rain); Makeup: August 16 as a traditional double-header
|- style="background:#fbb"
| 7 || April 18 || @ Mets || 2–5 || Ron Darling (1–0) || Steve Carlton (0–2) || Jesse Orosco (2) || 26,906 || 3–4
|- style="background:#fbb"
| 8 || April 19 || @ Mets || 2–3 || Dwight Gooden (2–0) || Shane Rawley (1–1) || None || 38,333 || 3–5
|- style="background:#fbb"
| 9 || April 20 || @ Mets || 0–8 || Sid Fernandez (1–0) || Kevin Gross (0–2) || None || 41,848 || 3–6
|- style="background:#fbb"
| 10 || April 22 || @ Expos || 2–8 || Andy McGaffigan (1–0) || Charles Hudson (1–1) || Tim Burke (2) || 4,276 || 3–7
|- style="background:#bfb"
| 11 || April 23 || @ Expos || 5–4 || Steve Carlton (1–2) || Joe Hesketh (0–3) || Steve Bedrosian (1) || 6,293 || 4–7
|- style="background:#bfb"
| 12 || April 24 || @ Pirates || 4–2 || Shane Rawley (2–1) || Rick Rhoden (2–1) || None || 14,622 || 5–7
|- style="background:#bfb"
| 13 || April 25 || @ Pirates || 6–3 || Kevin Gross (1–2) || Rick Reuschel (2–2) || Steve Bedrosian (2) || 11,847 || 6–7
|- style="background:#bfb"
| 14 || April 26 || @ Pirates || 6–5 || Charles Hudson (2–1) || Larry McWilliams (0–2) || Steve Bedrosian (3) || 16,373 || 7–7
|- style="background:#fbb"
| 15 || April 27 || @ Pirates || 5–13 || Mike Bielecki (1–0) || Steve Carlton (1–3) || Bob Walk (1) || 17,218 || 7–8
|- style="background:#bfb"
| 16 || April 29 || Astros || 12–4 || Shane Rawley (3–1) || Nolan Ryan (3–3) || None || 16,313 || 8–8
|- style="background:#fbb"
| 17 || April 30 || Astros || 0–1 || Mike Scott (3–2) || Kevin Gross (1–3) || Dave Smith (7) || 17,134 || 8–9
|-

|- style="background:#fbb"
| 18 || May 2 || Braves || 1–7 || David Palmer (2–1) || Steve Carlton (1–4) || None || 20,237 || 8–10
|- style="background:#fbb"
| 19 || May 3 || Braves || 4–10 || Rick Mahler (2–4) || Shane Rawley (3–2) || None || 20,511 || 8–11
|- style="background:#bfb"
| 20 || May 4 || Braves || 5–1 || Kevin Gross (2–3) || Joe Johnson (3–2) || None || 37,352 || 9–11
|- style="background:#fbb"
| 21 || May 5 || Expos || 4–6 || Dan Schatzeder (1–0) || Kent Tekulve (0–1) || Jeff Reardon (3) || 15,425 || 9–12
|- style="background:#fbb"
| 22 || May 6 || Expos || 0–8 || Andy McGaffigan (2–0) || Steve Carlton (1–5) || None || 16,528 || 9–13
|- style="background:#fbb"
| 23 || May 7 || Expos || 2–8 || Floyd Youmans (1–3) || Shane Rawley (3–3) || Tim Burke (3) || 15,840 || 9–14
|- style="background:#bfb"
| 24 || May 9 || @ Braves || 7–6 || Kevin Gross (3–3) || Joe Johnson (3–3) || Steve Bedrosian (4) || 11,817 || 10–14
|- style="background:#fbb"
| 25 || May 10 || @ Braves || 1–3 || Zane Smith (3–2) || Charles Hudson (2–2) || Paul Assenmacher (2) || 25,958 || 10–15
|- style="background:#bfb"
| 26 || May 11 || @ Braves || 2–1 || Steve Bedrosian (2–1) || Craig McMurtry (1–2) || None || 15,689 || 11–15
|- style="background:#bfb"
| 27 || May 12 || @ Astros || 5–1 || Shane Rawley (4–3) || Jim Deshaies (0–1) || None || 8,354 || 12–15
|- style="background:#fbb"
| 28 || May 13 || @ Astros || 2–3 (11) || Julio Solano (2–0) || Dave Rucker (0–1) || None || 7,087 || 12–16
|- style="background:#bfb"
| 29 || May 14 || Reds || 8–6 || Don Carman (1–0) || John Franco (0–1) || Steve Bedrosian (5) || 21,877 || 13–16
|- style="background:#fbb"
| 30 || May 15 || Reds || 5–6 || Ron Robinson (3–0) || Steve Bedrosian (2–2) || None || 20,767 || 13–17
|- style="background:#bfb"
| 31 || May 16 || @ Giants || 3–0 || Steve Carlton (2–5) || Roger Mason (2–3) || Kent Tekulve (1) || 16,560 || 14–17
|- style="background:#fbb"
| 32 || May 17 || @ Giants || 7–12 || Mike Krukow (5–3) || Shane Rawley (4–4) || Greg Minton (4) || 14,260 || 14–18
|- style="background:#fbb"
| 33 || May 18 || @ Giants || 1–4 || Scott Garrelts (4–3) || Freddie Toliver (0–1) || Jeff Robinson (4) || 31,186 || 14–19
|- style="background:#fbb"
| 34 || May 20 || @ Padres || 3–4 || Eric Show (3–2) || Kevin Gross (3–4) || Rich Gossage (8) || 13,997 || 14–20
|- style="background:#fbb"
| 35 || May 21 || @ Padres || 2–7 || Dave Dravecky (4–3) || Charles Hudson (2–3) || None || 12,674 || 14–21
|- style="background:#fbb"
| 36 || May 22 || @ Padres || 2–6 || Andy Hawkins (3–3) || Steve Carlton (2–6) || Craig Lefferts (1) || 21,173 || 14–22
|- style="background:#bfb"
| 37 || May 23 || @ Dodgers || 8–2 || Shane Rawley (5–4) || Jerry Reuss (2–3) || None || 39,354 || 15–22
|- style="background:#fbb"
| 38 || May 24 || @ Dodgers || 0–6 || Fernando Valenzuela (7–2) || Freddie Toliver (0–2) || None || 47,725 || 15–23
|- style="background:#fbb"
| 39 || May 25 || @ Dodgers || 2–5 || Orel Hershiser (5–3) || Kevin Gross (3–5) || None || 40,424 || 15–24
|- style="background:#bfb"
| 40 || May 27 || Giants || 6–2 || Steve Carlton (3–6) || Jeff Robinson (2–1) || None || 16,023 || 16–24
|- style="background:#bfb"
| 41 || May 28 || Giants || 4–0 || Shane Rawley (6–4) || Scott Garrelts (4–5) || None || 17,003 || 17–24
|- style="background:#bfb"
| 42 || May 29 || Giants || 5–4 || Don Carman (2–0) || Greg Minton (2–3) || None || 17,785 || 18–24
|- style="background:#bfb"
| 43 || May 30 || Padres || 2–0 || Kevin Gross (4–5) || Eric Show (3–3) || None || 10,608 || 19–24
|- style="background:#bfb"
| 44 || May 31 || Padres || 1–0 || Charles Hudson (3–3) || Dave Dravecky (5–4) || Steve Bedrosian (6) || 21,211 || 20–24
|-

|- style="background:#bfb"
| 45 || June 1 || Padres || 16–5 || Steve Carlton (4–6) || Andy Hawkins (3–4) || None || 35,144 || 21–24
|- style="background:#bfb"
| 46 || June 2 || Dodgers || 13–2 || Shane Rawley (7–4) || Jerry Reuss (2–5) || None || 21,476 || 22–24
|- style="background:#fbb"
| 47 || June 3 || Dodgers || 4–11 || Fernando Valenzuela (8–3) || Mike Maddux (0–1) || None || 24,373 || 22–25
|- style="background:#bfb"
| 48 || June 4 || Dodgers || 8–7 || Kevin Gross (5–5) || Orel Hershiser (5–4) || Steve Bedrosian (7) || 26,983 || 23–25
|- style="background:#bfb"
| 49 || June 5 || @ Expos || 7–3 || Charles Hudson (4–3) || Jay Tibbs (3–2) || None || 10,845 || 24–25
|- style="background:#fbb"
| 50 || June 6 || @ Expos || 9–10 (10) || Tim Burke (3–1) || Dave Rucker (0–2) || None || 18,325 || 24–26
|- style="background:#bfb"
| 51 || June 7 || @ Expos || 3–1 || Shane Rawley (8–4) || Andy McGaffigan (3–2) || None || 20,486 || 25–26
|- style="background:#fbb"
| 52 || June 8 || @ Expos || 0–12 || Floyd Youmans (5–5) || Mike Maddux (0–2) || None || 20,743 || 25–27
|- style="background:#bfb"
| 53 || June 9 || @ Mets || 3–2 (10) || Don Carman (3–0) || Doug Sisk (0–1) || Steve Bedrosian (8) || 26,050 || 26–27
|- style="background:#fbb"
| 54 || June 10 || @ Mets || 4–8 (11) || Roger McDowell (6–0) || Randy Lerch (0–1) || None || 27,472 || 26–28
|- style="background:#fbb"
| 55 || June 11 || @ Mets || 3–5 || Ron Darling (7–2) || Steve Carlton (4–7) || Jesse Orosco (11) || 27,830 || 26–29
|- style="background:#bfb"
| 56 || June 13 || Expos || 2–1 || Shane Rawley (9–4) || Tim Burke (4–2) || None || 24,491 || 27–29
|- style="background:#bfb"
| 57 || June 14 || Expos || 7–6 || Randy Lerch (1–1) || Bert Roberge (0–2) || Steve Bedrosian (9) || 25,769 || 28–29
|- style="background:#fbb"
| 58 || June 15 || Expos || 0–2 || Andy McGaffigan (4–2) || Charles Hudson (4–4) || Jeff Reardon (15) || 30,242 || 28–30
|- style="background:#fbb"
| 59 || June 16 || @ Cubs || 5–7 || Jamie Moyer (1–0) || Steve Carlton (4–8) || Lee Smith (9) || 20,614 || 28–31
|- style="background:#bfb"
| 60 || June 17 || @ Cubs || 11–8 || Kent Tekulve (1–1) || Ray Fontenot (2–2) || None || 27,114 || 29–31
|- style="background:#fbb"
| 61 || June 18 || @ Cubs || 4–5 (10) || Lee Smith (4–4) || Steve Bedrosian (2–3) || None || 38,093 || 29–32
|- style="background:#bfb"
| 62 || June 19 || Cardinals || 5–3 || Kevin Gross (6–5) || Ray Burris (3–3) || Don Carman (1) || 22,376 || 30–32
|- style="background:#fbb"
| 63 || June 20 || Cardinals || 2–9 || Bob Forsch (6–4) || Charles Hudson (4–5) || None || 25,292 || 30–33
|- style="background:#fbb"
| 64 || June 21 || Cardinals || 6–8 || Todd Worrell (4–7) || Don Carman (3–1) || Ken Dayley (3) || 38,601 || 30–34
|- style="background:#fbb"
| 65 || June 22 || Cardinals || 4–7 || Greg Mathews (4–1) || Mike Maddux (0–3) || Todd Worrell (13) || 32,570 || 30–35
|- style="background:#bfb"
| 66 || June 23 || Cubs || 19–1 || Shane Rawley (10–4) || Jamie Moyer (1–1) || None || 21,899 || 31–35
|- style="background:#bfb"
| 67 || June 24 || Cubs || 7–6 (10) || Steve Bedrosian (3–3) || Lee Smith (4–5) || None || 24,757 || 32–35
|- style="background:#fbb"
| 68 || June 25 || Cubs || 7–10 || Guy Hoffman (3–2) || Charles Hudson (4–6) || Lee Smith (11) || 22,085 || 32–36
|- style="background:#bfb"
| 69 || June 27 || @ Cardinals || 2–1 (17) || Kent Tekulve (2–1) || Rick Ownbey (1–2) || Tom Hume (1) || 37,903 || 33–36
|- style="background:#bfb"
| 70 || June 28 || @ Cardinals || 7–4 (10) || Steve Bedrosian (4–3) || Pat Perry (1–2) || Tom Hume (2) || 43,513 || 34–36
|- style="background:#bfb"
| 71 || June 29 || @ Cardinals || 8–7 || Steve Bedrosian (5–3) || Todd Worrell (5–8) || None || 42,959 || 35–36
|- style="background:#fbb"
| 72 || June 30 || @ Pirates || 2–3 || Bob Walk (3–4) || Charles Hudson (4–7) || Cecilio Guante (4) || 5,881 || 35–37
|-

|- style="background:#bfb"
| 73 || July 1 || @ Pirates || 5–4 (12) || Tom Hume (1–0) || Larry McWilliams (1–5) || None || 8,118 || 36–37
|- style="background:#fbb"
| 74 || July 2 || @ Pirates || 3–4 || Rick Rhoden (9–4) || Don Carman (3–2) || None || 6,782 || 36–38
|- style="background:#bfb"
| 75 || July 3 || Reds || 7–3 || Bruce Ruffin (1–0) || John Denny (5–8) || Tom Hume (3) || 61,475 || 37–38
|- style="background:#fbb"
| 76 || July 4 || Reds || 1–4 || Tom Browning (6–7) || Kevin Gross (6–6) || Ron Robinson (6) || 20,490 || 37–39
|- style="background:#fbb"
| 77 || July 5 || Reds || 2–7 || Chris Welsh (3–2) || Charles Hudson (4–8) || None || 23,620 || 37–40
|- style="background:#bfb"
| 78 || July 6 || Reds || 12–5 || Tom Hume (2–0) || Joe Price (1–2) || Kent Tekulve (2) || 28,420 || 38–40
|- style="background:#bfb"
| 79 || July 7 || Braves || 7–3 || Shane Rawley (11–4) || David Palmer (5–7) || Steve Bedrosian (10) || 18,768 || 39–40
|- style="background:#bfb"
| 80 || July 8 || Braves || 8–2 || Bruce Ruffin (2–0) || Rick Mahler (10–7) || None || 22,202 || 40–40
|- style="background:#fbb"
| 81 || July 9 || Braves || 3–7 || Doyle Alexander (6–4) || Kevin Gross (6–7) || Gene Garber (10) || 27,371 || 40–41
|- style="background:#fbb"
| 82 || July 10 || @ Astros || 4–11 || Mark Knudson (1–3) || Charles Hudson (4–9) || None || 18,289 || 40–42
|- style="background:#bfb"
| 83 || July 11 || @ Astros || 4–1 || Don Carman (4–2) || Mike Scott (9–6) || Steve Bedrosian (11) || 18,047 || 41–42
|- style="background:#fbb"
| 84 || July 12 || @ Astros || 3–4 || Nolan Ryan (6–6) || Shane Rawley (11–5) || Dave Smith (17) || 17,491 || 41–43
|- style="background:#bfb"
| 85 || July 13 || @ Astros || 5–4 (11) || Steve Bedrosian (6–3) || Dave Smith (1–6) || None || 20,597 || 42–43
|- style="background:#bbcaff;"
| – || July 15 ||colspan="7" |1986 Major League Baseball All-Star Game at the Astrodome in Houston
|- style="background:#fbb"
| 86 || July 17 || @ Reds || 6–7 (11) || Ted Power (4–5) || Tom Gorman (0–1) || None || 24,488 || 42–44
|- style="background:#fbb"
| 87 || July 18 || @ Reds || 5–6 || Tom Browning (9–7) || Bruce Ruffin (2–1) || John Franco (15) || 24,072 || 42–45
|- style="background:#fbb"
| 88 || July 19 || @ Reds || 2–5 || Bill Gullickson (7–6) || Shane Rawley (11–6) || Ron Robinson (8) || 20,994 || 42–46
|- style="background:#bfb"
| 89 || July 20 || @ Reds || 9–3 || Charles Hudson (5–9) || John Denny (6–9) || None || 26,190 || 43–46
|- style="background:#bfb"
| 90 || July 21 || @ Braves || 3–1 || Kent Tekulve (3–1) || Jeff Dedmon (3–5) || Steve Bedrosian (12) || 12,731 || 44–46
|- style="background:#bfb"
| 91 || July 22 || @ Braves || 5–4 (11) || Steve Bedrosian (7–3) || Craig McMurtry (1–6) || Tom Hume (4) || 14,249 || 45–46
|- style="background:#bfb"
| 92 || July 23 || @ Braves || 4–2 || Bruce Ruffin (3–1) || Doyle Alexander (6–6) || None || 11,770 || 46–46
|- style="background:#fbb"
| 93 || July 24 || Astros || 3–9 || Mike Scott (10–6) || Shane Rawley (11–7) || None || 31,094 || 46–47
|- style="background:#bfb"
| 94 || July 25 || Astros || 4–2 || Charles Hudson (6–9) || Jim Deshaies (5–3) || Steve Bedrosian (13) || 23,387 || 47–47
|- style="background:#bfb"
| 95 || July 26 || Astros || 3–2 || Don Carman (5–2) || Mark Knudson (1–4) || Dan Schatzeder (2) || 34,075 || 48–47
|- style="background:#fbb"
| 96 || July 27 || Astros || 2–3 || Nolan Ryan (7–7) || Kevin Gross (6–8) || Aurelio López (4) || 33,192 || 48–48
|- style="background:#fbb"
| 97 || July 28 || Cardinals || 1–3 || Danny Cox (5–8) || Bruce Ruffin (3–2) || None || 21,553 || 48–49
|- style="background:#bfb"
| 98 || July 29 || Cardinals || 12–7 || Tom Hume (3–0) || Tim Conroy (3–6) || None || 21,970 || 49–49
|- style="background:#fbb"
| 99 || July 30 || Cardinals || 3–6 || Bob Forsch (10–6) || Charles Hudson (6–10) || Todd Worrell (21) || 24,324 || 49–50
|-

|- style="background:#bfb"
| 100 || August 1 || Cubs || 4–3 (11) || Kent Tekulve (4–1) || Frank DiPino (1–6) || None || 25,892 || 50–50
|- style="background:#bfb"
| 101 || August 2 || Cubs || 12–2 || Kevin Gross (7–8) || Scott Sanderson (5–8) || None || 22,062 || 51–50
|- style="background:#bfb"
| 102 || August 3 || Cubs || 6–2 || Steve Bedrosian (8–3) || Frank DiPino (1–7) || None || 27,330 || 52–50
|- style="background:#fbb"
| 103 || August 4 || @ Cardinals || 2–3 || Todd Worrell (7–8) || Dan Schatzeder (3–3) || None || 27,059 || 52–51
|- style="background:#fbb"
| 104 || August 5 || @ Cardinals || 4–7 || Bob Forsch (11–6) || Mike Maddux (0–4) || None || 24,870 || 52–52
|- style="background:#fbb"
| 105 || August 6 || @ Cardinals || 1–2 || Greg Mathews (7–3) || Don Carman (5–3) || Todd Worrell (22) || 32,714 || 52–53
|- style="background:#fbb"
| 106 || August 7 || @ Cardinals || 5–6 || John Tudor (11–5) || Kevin Gross (7–9) || Todd Worrell (23) || 23,171 || 52–54
|- style="background:#fbb"
| 107 || August 8 || @ Cubs || 1–2 || Steve Trout (5–5) || Bruce Ruffin (3–3) || Lee Smith (21) || 27,811 || 52–55
|- style="background:#bfb"
| 108 || August 9 || @ Cubs || 4–2 || Charles Hudson (7–10) || Dennis Eckersley (6–7) || Steve Bedrosian (14) || 33,003 || 53–55
|- style="background:#fbb"
| 109 || August 10 || @ Cubs || 0–4 || Ed Lynch (3–1) || Mike Maddux (0–5) || None || 30,009 || 53–56
|- style="background:#fbb"
| 110 || August 11 || Mets || 4–8 || Dwight Gooden (12–4) || Don Carman (5–4) || None || 43,133 || 53–57
|- style="background:#bfb"
| 111 || August 12 || Mets || 3–1 || Kevin Gross (8–9) || Rick Aguilera (6–4) || None || 36,442 || 54–57
|- style="background:#bfb"
| 112 || August 13 || Mets || 8–4 || Bruce Ruffin (4–3) || Bob Ojeda (12–4) || None || 39,041 || 55–57
|- style="background:#bfb"
| 113 || August 14 || Pirates || 8–7 || Kent Tekulve (5–1) || Barry Jones (1–2) || None || 20,643 || 56–57
|- style="background:#fbb"
| 114 || August 15 (1) || Pirates || 5–6 || Cecilio Guante (5–2) || Dan Schatzeder (3–4) || Don Robinson (8) || see 2nd game || 56–58
|- style="background:#bfb"
| 115 || August 15 (2) || Pirates || 3–2 || Mike Maddux (1–5) || Jim Winn (2–5) || Steve Bedrosian (15) || 27,724 || 57–58
|- style="background:#fbb"
| 116 || August 16 (1) || Pirates || 1–6 || Rick Rhoden (13–7) || Kevin Gross (8–10) || None || see 2nd game || 57–59
|- style="background:#bfb"
| 117 || August 16 (2) || Pirates || 6–0 || Tom Hume (4–0) || Larry McWilliams (2–9) || Kent Tekulve (3) || 31,349 || 58–59
|- style="background:#bfb"
| 118 || August 17 || Pirates || 5–1 (5) || Bruce Ruffin (5–3) || Rick Reuschel (7–14) || None || 34,298 || 59–59
|- style="background:#bfb"
| 119 || August 19 || @ Giants || 6–5 || Kent Tekulve (6–1) || Scott Garrelts (10–9) || Steve Bedrosian (16) || 10,316 || 60–59
|- style="background:#bfb"
| 120 || August 20 || @ Giants || 1–0 (10) || Don Carman (6–4) || Mike Krukow (12–7) || Steve Bedrosian (17) || 10,723 || 61–59
|- style="background:#fbb"
| 121 || August 21 || @ Giants || 6–7 || Mark Davis (4–4) || Kent Tekulve (6–2) || Scott Garrelts (5) || 7,959 || 61–60
|- style="background:#bfb"
| 122 || August 22 || @ Padres || 4–1 || Bruce Ruffin (6–3) || Ed Whitson (6–8) || None || 16,296 || 62–60
|- style="background:#fbb"
| 123 || August 23 || @ Padres || 3–4 (12) || Lance McCullers (6–6) || Kent Tekulve (6–3) || None || 25,884 || 62–61
|- style="background:#bfb"
| 124 || August 24 || @ Padres || 6–5 || Kent Tekulve (7–3) || Rich Gossage (5–6) || Steve Bedrosian (18) || 13,409 || 63–61
|- style="background:#fbb"
| 125 || August 25 || @ Dodgers || 1–3 || Fernando Valenzuela (16–9) || Don Carman (6–5) || None || 35,553 || 63–62
|- style="background:#bfb"
| 126 || August 26 || @ Dodgers || 6–4 || Kevin Gross (9–10) || Ed Vande Berg (1–5) || None || 30,979 || 64–62
|- style="background:#bfb"
| 127 || August 27 || @ Dodgers || 2–1 || Bruce Ruffin (7–3) || Bob Welch (6–10) || Steve Bedrosian (19) || 23,543 || 65–62
|- style="background:#bfb"
| 128 || August 29 || Giants || 6–4 || Mike Maddux (2–5) || Mike Krukow (13–8) || Steve Bedrosian (20) || 21,572 || 66–62
|- style="background:#bfb"
| 129 || August 30 || Giants || 5–3 || Don Carman (7–5) || Mike LaCoss (9–10) || Steve Bedrosian (21) || 23,022 || 67–62
|- style="background:#bfb"
| 130 || August 31 || Giants || 4–3 || Kent Tekulve (8–3) || Vida Blue (9–9) || Steve Bedrosian (22) || 24,082 || 68–62
|-

|- style="background:#bfb"
| 131 || September 1 || Padres || 5–4 || Kent Tekulve (9–3) || Craig Lefferts (7–6) || None || 25,385 || 69–62
|- style="background:#fbb"
| 132 || September 2 || Padres || 2–6 || Dave LaPoint (4–7) || Jeff Bittiger (0–1) || None || 15,553 || 69–63
|- style="background:#fbb"
| 133 || September 3 || Padres || 5–6 || Bob Stoddard (1–0) || Steve Bedrosian (8–4) || Lance McCullers (3) || 15,066 || 69–64
|- style="background:#bfb"
| 134 || September 5 || Dodgers || 4–0 || Don Carman (8–5) || Orel Hershiser (12–11) || Steve Bedrosian (23) || 15,245 || 70–64
|- style="background:#fbb"
| 135 || September 6 || Dodgers || 2–3 || Fernando Valenzuela (18–9) || Kevin Gross (9–11) || None || 22,394 || 70–65
|- style="background:#bfb"
| 136 || September 7 || Dodgers || 2–1 || Kent Tekulve (10–3) || Ken Howell (5–10) || None || 25,706 || 71–65
|- style="background:#fbb"
| 137 || September 8 || @ Cubs || 4–7 || Ed Lynch (5–4) || Mike Maddux (2–6) || Lee Smith (26) || 6,857 || 71–66
|- style="background:#fbb"
| 138 || September 9 || @ Cubs || 6–8 (10) || Lee Smith (9–9) || Steve Bedrosian (8–5) || None || 8,785 || 71–67
|- style="background:#fbb"
| 139 || September 10 || @ Cubs || 7–8 || Guy Hoffman (5–2) || Kent Tekulve (10–4) || Lee Smith (27) || 9,029 || 71–68
|- style="background:#bfb"
| 140 || September 12 || Mets || 6–3 || Bruce Ruffin (8–3) || Dwight Gooden (14–6) || Steve Bedrosian (24) || 43,070 || 72–68
|- style="background:#bfb"
| 141 || September 13 || Mets || 6–5 || Dan Schatzeder (4–4) || Roger McDowell (13–8) || Steve Bedrosian (25) || 47,108 || 73–68
|- style="background:#bfb"
| 142 || September 14 || Mets || 6–0 || Kevin Gross (10–11) || Sid Fernandez (15–5) || None || 38,652 || 74–68
|- style="background:#bfb"
| 143 || September 15 || Pirates || 5–0 || Don Carman (9–5) || Rick Rhoden (15–9) || None || 14,089 || 75–68
|- style="background:#bfb"
| 144 || September 16 || Pirates || 9–5 || Kent Tekulve (11–4) || Mike Bielecki (6–11) || None || 14,315 || 76–68
|- style="background:#fbb"
| 145 || September 17 || Cardinals || 5–8 || Bob Forsch (14–8) || Bruce Ruffin (8–4) || Todd Worrell (34) || 15,737 || 76–69
|- style="background:#bfb"
| 146 || September 18 || Cardinals || 4–3 || Mike Maddux (3–6) || Greg Mathews (10–7) || Steve Bedrosian (26) || 12,847 || 77–69
|- style="background:#bfb"
| 147 || September 19 || @ Mets || 4–3 || Kevin Gross (11–11) || Sid Fernandez (15–6) || Steve Bedrosian (27) || 35,023 || 78–69
|- style="background:#fbb"
| 148 || September 20 || @ Mets || 5–9 || Ron Darling (14–5) || Tom Hume (4–1) || None || 39,104 || 78–70
|- style="background:#bfb"
| 149 || September 21 || @ Mets || 7–1 || Marvin Freeman (1–0) || John Mitchell (0–1) || None || 42,631 || 79–70
|- style="background:#bfb"
| 150 || September 22 || @ Pirates || 8–4 || Jeff Bittiger (1–1) || Bob Kipper (5–8) || None || 3,934 || 80–70
|- style="background:#fbb"
| 151 || September 23 || @ Pirates || 5–6 || Barry Jones (3–4) || Steve Bedrosian (8–6) || None || 3,631 || 80–71
|- style="background:#fbb"
| 152 || September 24 || @ Cardinals || 1–7 || Danny Cox (11–12) || Kevin Gross (11–12) || None || 21,272 || 80–72
|- style="background:#fbb"
| 153 || September 25 || @ Cardinals || 4–5 || Ray Soff (4–0) || Dan Schatzeder (4–5) || Todd Worrell (35) || 15,595 || 80–73
|- style="background:#bfb"
| 154 || September 26 || @ Expos || 5–0 || Marvin Freeman (2–0) || Sergio Valdez (0–4) || Kent Tekulve (4) || 6,133 || 81–73
|- style="background:#bfb"
| 155 || September 27 || @ Expos || 1–0 || Don Carman (10–5) || Floyd Youmans (13–11) || Steve Bedrosian (28) || 6,493 || 82–73
|- style="background:#bfb"
| 156 || September 28 || @ Expos || 5–2 || Kevin Gross (12–12) || Dennis Martínez (3–6) || Steve Bedrosian (29) || 10,064 || 83–73
|- style="background:#fbb"
| 157 || September 29 || Cubs || 3–8 || Greg Maddux (2–4) || Mike Maddux (3–7) || None || 14,355 || 83–74
|- style="background:#bfb"
| 158 || September 30 || Cubs || 9–2 || Bruce Ruffin (9–4) || Drew Hall (1–2) || None || 13,377 || 84–74
|-

|- style="background:#bbb"
| – || October 1 || Cubs || colspan=6 | Cancelled (rain); Was not rescheduled
|- style="background:#fbb"
| 159 || October 3 || Expos || 5–6 || Andy McGaffigan (10–5) || Kent Tekulve (11–5) || Randy St. Claire (1) || 11,614 || 84–75
|- style="background:#bfb"
| 160 || October 4 || Expos || 5–4 (14) || Dan Schatzeder (5–5) || Bert Roberge (0–4) || None || 16,796 || 85–75
|- style="background:#bfb"
| 161 || October 5 || Expos || 2–1 (10) || Dan Schatzeder' (6–5) || Curt Brown (0–1) || None || 25,293 || 86–75
|-

Roster

 Player stats 

 Batting 

 Starters by position Note: Pos = Position; G = Games played; AB = At bats; H = Hits; Avg. = Batting average; HR = Home runs; RBI = Runs batted in Other batters Note: G = Games played; AB = At bats; H = Hits; Avg. = Batting average; HR = Home runs; RBI = Runs batted in Pitching 

 Starting pitchers Note: G = Games pitched; IP = Innings pitched; W = Wins; L = Losses; ERA = Earned run average; SO = Strikeouts Other pitchers Note: G = Games pitched; IP = Innings pitched; W = Wins; L = Losses; ERA = Earned run average; SO = StrikeoutsRelief pitchersNote: G = Games pitched; W = Wins; L = Losses; SV = Saves; ERA = Earned run average; SO = Strikeouts''

Awards and honors
Garry Maddox, Roberto Clemente Award
Mike Schmidt, National League MVP

Farm system

Notes

References
1986 Philadelphia Phillies season at Baseball Reference

Philadelphia Phillies seasons
Philadelphia Phillies season
Philadelphia